Wingate is a ghost town in Butler County, Kansas, United States.  No buildings remain at this former community site.

History
Wingate had a short-lived post office in the 1880s.

Education
The modern day rural area around Wingate is served by the Bluestem USD 205 public school district,

References

Further reading

External links
 Butler County maps: Current, Historic, KDOT

Unincorporated communities in Butler County, Kansas
Unincorporated communities in Kansas